{{Infobox writer
| name = Barbara Stern Burstin
| image =
| imagesize = 
| caption = 
| birth_name = Barbara Stern
| birth_date = 
| birth_place = 
| occupation = Historian, Author, Professor
| alma_mater = Vassar college
| genre = Holocaust; Pittsburgh Jewish history
| movement = 
| notableworks = After the Holocaust: The Migration of Polish Jews and Christians to Pittsburgh (May 1989) Steel City Jews  1840-1915 (vol 1) (Oct 24, 2008)""Steel City Jews in Prosperity, Depression and War 1915 - 1950 (vol 2) (2015)""Pittsburgh Jews (2017)"
| children = 4
| website = 
}}
Barbara Stern Burstin is an adjunct professor in the history departments at the University of Pittsburgh and Carnegie Mellon University. She has published several books and articles relating to the Holocaust and the history of Jews in Pittsburgh.

 Early life and education 
The daughter of Mildred and Joseph Stern, Burstin was raised in Farmingdale, New York. Aaron Stern, her grandfather, was one of the first Jews to settle in Farmingdale, and operated Stern's Pickle Factory. Burstin earned a bachelor's degree in economics from Vassar College, in Poughkeepsie, N.Y. in 1962 and went on to gain her master's in history education from Columbia University in 1963 prior to acquiring her doctorate in history from the University of Pittsburgh in 1986.

Awards
In addition to awards from the Pittsburgh Chapter of the Zionist Organization of America, Burstin is a past recipient of the Sonia & Aaron Levinson Community Relations Award, the Solon J. Buck Award (1987), and the Oskar Halecki  Prize from the Polish-American Historical Society (1991) and has been nominated for a regional Emmy Award for the film A Jewish Legacy (2000).Department of History, Barbara Burstin . University of Pittsburgh, Pittsburgh PA.

Selected worksAfter the Holocaust: The Migration of Polish Jews and Christians to Pittsburgh, University of Pittsburgh Press, 1989, 978-0822936039Steel City Jews, 978-09820633J09The Warsaw Ghetto: A Shattered Window on the Holocaust,  in History Teacher, v13 n4 p531–41 Aug 1980.A Jewish Legacy (2000) (film)Steel City Jews: A history of the Pittsburgh Jewish community 1840-1915 (2015)Steel City Jews in Prosperity, Depression, and War: A history of the Pittsburgh Jewish community 1915-1950 (2015)Jewish Pittsburgh "Images of America Series"'' (2015)

References and citations

External links
Congregation Beth Tikvah, Dedication, Farmingdale, New York. June 8, 2014 7:15 AM version, Accessed 16 November 2015.
Department of History, Barbara Burstin. University of Pittsburgh, Pittsburgh PA.
Monty Noam Penkower, Reviewed Work: After the Holocaust: The Migration of Polish Jews and Christians to Pittsburgh. by Barbara Stern Burstin , The Journal of American History Vol. 77, No. 1 (Jun., 1990), pp. 350–351. 
Website, https://www.sophiemasloff.com 

Living people
21st-century American historians
Historians of the Holocaust
University of Pittsburgh faculty
Carnegie Mellon University faculty
American women historians
People from Farmingdale, New York
Year of birth missing (living people)
21st-century American women
Historians from New York (state)